Santosh Yadav (born 1955) is an Indian politician. She is the incumbent deputy speaker of the Haryana Legislative Assembly. She was MLA from constituency Ateli. She is also having a house in Narnaul. She has two brothers. She joined BJP after leaving INLD. She is having her workers from many villages like Dongra ahir etc. She approached for passing PHC in Dongra Ahir and also a road from Dongra Ahir to nearby village. She is very well supported in her area [Ateli]. She did not get election ticket from BJP in 2019 election. She was good in sports during her childhood. She visits Dongra ahir frequently. She is very popular.

References

Living people
1955 births
Deputy Speakers of the Haryana Legislative Assembly
Bharatiya Janata Party politicians from Haryana
People from Mahendragarh district
Haryana MLAs 2014–2019
21st-century Indian women politicians
Women members of the Haryana Legislative Assembly